Saint Veranus of Cavaillon (died ) was a French bishop.

Saint Vrain, Saint-Vrain or St. Vrain may also refer to:

People
 Ceran St. Vrain (1802–1870), American fur trader of French descent
 Felix St. Vrain (1790–1832), United States Indian agent of French descent
 Jim St. Vrain (1871–1937), American baseball player

Places

France 
 Saint-Véran, a commune in the Hautes-Alpes department
 Saint-Vrain, Marne, a commune of the Champagne-Ardenne region
 Saint-Vrain, Essonne, a commune of the Île-de-France region

United States 
 Fort Saint Vrain, a 19th-century fur trading post in Colorado
 Saint Vrain Glaciers, a series of glaciers in the Rocky Mountains of Colorado
 St. Vrain State Park, Colorado
 St. Vrain Valley School District in Longmont, Colorado
 St. Vrain, Colorado, a ghost town in Weld County, Colorado
 St. Vrain, New Mexico
 St. Vrain's County, Jefferson Territory, later part of Colorado

See also 
 St. Vrains, Colorado